The BMW R1150R is a standard (or roadster) motorcycle made by BMW Motorrad from 2001 through 2005, the successor to the R 1100 R that had been discontinued in 1999. The R 1150 R was marketed as a road going motorcycle suited for general commuting as well as sports touring. In 2006 it was succeeded by the R 1200 R.

Compared to the related R 1150 RT touring motorcycle, the R 1150 RS sport-touring bike, and the R 1150 GS dual-sport (or adventure) bike, the R or 'roadster' version was the non-specialist, aimed at the 'all-rounder' niche, emphasizing balanced traits, and versatility. It had a Telelever front suspension, and a Paralever rear. Antilock brakes were an option.

R1150R
Motorcycles powered by flat engines
Shaft drive motorcycles
Standard motorcycles
Motorcycles introduced in 2001